The 19th Dallas–Fort Worth Film Critics Association Awards honoring the best in film for 2013 were announced on December 16, 2013. These awards "recognizing extraordinary accomplishment in film" are presented annually by the Dallas–Fort Worth Film Critics Association (DFWFCA), based in the Dallas–Fort Worth metroplex region of Texas. The organization, founded in 1990, includes 29 film critics for print, radio, television, and internet publications based in north Texas. The Dallas–Fort Worth Film Critics Association began presenting its annual awards list in 1993.

12 Years a Slave and Gravity were the DFWFCA's most awarded films of 2013, each taking three top honors. The former won Best Picture, Best Screenplay (John Ridley), and Best Supporting Actress (Lupita Nyong'o), while the latter won Best Director (Alfonso Cuarón), Best Cinematography (Emmanuel Lubezki), and Best Musical Score (Steven Price). The Best Picture win for 12 Years a Slave continued a trend of critics groups across the United States giving their top prizes to the film adaptation of the autobiography by Solomon Northup, a free negro who was kidnapped and sold into slavery.

Only one other film, Dallas Buyers Club, earned multiple 2013 honors from the DFWFCA. Set in mid-1980s Dallas, the drama received top honors for Best Actor (Matthew McConaughey) and Best Supporting Actor (Jared Leto). Cate Blanchett was named Best Actress for her title role in Blue Jasmine. The other films earning honors were France's Blue Is the Warmest Colour for Best Foreign Language Film, 20 Feet from Stardom as Best Documentary Film, and Frozen for Best Animated Film.

Along with the 12 "best of" category awards, the group also presented the Russell Smith Award to Fruitvale Station as the "best low-budget or cutting-edge independent film" of the year. The award is named in honor of late Dallas Morning News film critic Russell Smith.

Winners
Winners are listed first and highlighted with boldface. Other films ranked by the annual poll are listed in order. While most categories saw 5 honorees named, categories ranged from as many as 10 (Best Film) to as few as 2 (Best Cinematography, Best Animated Film) plus the Best Musical Score category having only the winner announced.

Category awards

Individual awards

Russell Smith Award
 Fruitvale Station, for "best low-budget or cutting-edge independent film"

References

2013
2013 film awards